Felicioli is an Italian surname. Notable people with the surname include:

 Gian Filippo Felicioli (born 1997), Italian footballer
 Jean-Loup Felicioli (born 1960), French film maker

Italian-language surnames